Primitive Baptist Church of Sweeten's Cove is a historic Primitive Baptist church in Marion County, Tennessee, located in the Sweeten's Cove area in the Sequatchie Valley, about  north of South Pittsburg.

Sweeten's Cove, which is identified as Sweeden's Cove in some old maps and documents, was an area of early settlement, primarily by members of the Beene (Bean) and Raulston (Roulston) families. The church was established around 1821 as Union Primitive Baptist Church. It adopted its current name in 1834. The church building was completed in 1853.

On June 4, 1862, Sweeten's Cove was the site of a minor battle between Union Army forces under General James Negley and a Confederate cavalry unit led by Colonel John Adams.

The church was added to the National Register of Historic Places in 1983.

References

Further reading
 Blevins, Jerry. 1987. Union Primitive Baptist Church Book, 1821-1868: Name Changed in 1834 to Sweeten's Cove Primitive Baptist Church, Marion County, Tennessee. 250 pages.

Baptist churches in Tennessee
Churches on the National Register of Historic Places in Tennessee
Churches completed in 1853
19th-century Baptist churches in the United States
Buildings and structures in Marion County, Tennessee
National Register of Historic Places in Marion County, Tennessee
Primitive Baptists